Colonel Walter O'Hara ( – 13 January 1874) was a prominent member of the British army in the 19th century, participating in battles fighting Napoleon, before immigrating to Toronto, Ontario, Canada, where he participated in the Rebellions of 1837 on the side of the government, defeating the rebels of William Lyon Mackenzie.

In 1850, O'Hara was granted a  property on the western border of Toronto, forming the basis of the Brockton and Parkdale villages.

Today, several streets in Toronto are named after his family, estate or prominence in his life:

Roncesvalles Avenue – the site of a battle against Napoleon in Spain,
Sorauren Avenue – another battle site in Spain
Fermanagh Avenue – the county of his birth in Ireland
Marion Street – the name of his wife
Constance Street – the name of his daughter
West Lodge Avenue – the name of his estate
Alhambra Avenue – the palace in Granada, Spain
O'Hara Avenue

External links 
 Biography at the Dictionary of Canadian Biography Online

1789 births
1874 deaths
Year of birth uncertain
Year of birth unknown